Eurata plutonica is a moth of the subfamily Arctiinae. It was described by George Hampson in 1914. It is found in Mexico.

References

 

Arctiinae
Moths described in 1914